William D. Coplin is a professor and the director of the undergraduate public affairs program at the Maxwell School of Citizenship and Public Affairs at Syracuse University. He is a Meredith Professor for Teaching Excellence.

In 1993, he received the Chancellor's Citation for Distinguished Service by Syracuse University. He was appointed one of the first three Laura J. and L. Douglas Meredith Professor for Teaching Excellence at Syracuse University in 1995.

He is the founder of the Do Good Society and had a hand in starting the Leadership & Public Service High School in New York City. He is the chairman of the board for the John Dau Sudan Foundation.

Coplin is a contributor to USA Today.

Policy Studies Major 

He is the director of the highly selective Policy Studies undergraduate major in Maxwell School of Citizenship and Public Affairs. The program started in 1976. Today, despite its strict entrance requirements, it is one of the largest interdisciplinary undergraduate majors at Syracuse University. Entrance Requirements for the major are to get at least a B in PAF 101: An Introduction to the Analysis of Public Policy and complete 35 hours of community service in Onondaga County. Student have to meet with Professor Coplin with their unofficial transcript to be admitted.

The primary goal of the major is to develop skills to do well professionally and to do good as an active citizen. The major is completed through coursework from throughout the university. Student will acquire skills in report writing, problem-solving, information gathering, computer applications, quantitative analysis, and working in teams as you study major public policy issues.

Books 
25 Ways to Make College Pay Off: Advice for Anxious Parents from a Professor Who's Seen It All
10 Things Employers Want You to Learn in College (Tenspeed Press)
How You Can Help: An Easy Guide to Doing Good Deeds in Your Everyday Life (Routledge)
The Maxwell Manual for Good Citizenship: Public Policy Skills in Action

References

External links
Coplin's Podcast
Coplin's blog
Do Good Society
John Dau Sudan Foundation

Year of birth missing (living people)
Living people
Syracuse University faculty